David Savić (born August 23, 1985) is a Serbian tennis coach and former professional tennis player. In 2012 he was banned from tennis for match-fixing. After an appeal to the Court of Arbitration for Sport, the permanent suspension was upheld but the fine was withdrawn.

He is the coach of Serbian tennis player Danilo Petrović.

Personal
His father is Dragan Savić, Serbian former tennis player who represented Yugoslavia in Davis Cup.

References

External links

Living people
Serbian male tennis players
Serbian tennis coaches
Tennis players from Belgrade
1985 births
Tennis controversies